Nirod Kumar Biswas was Bishop of Assam in the mid 20th century.

Notes

Anglican bishops of Assam
20th-century Anglican bishops in India